Scott A. Keller is an American attorney who served as the sixth solicitor general of Texas from January 2015 to September 10, 2018.

Early life and education 

Keller was raised in Wisconsin. He earned a Bachelor of Arts degree in political science and philosophy from Purdue University and a Juris Doctor from the University of Texas School of Law.

Career 

After graduating from law school, Keller worked as a law clerk for Judge Alex Kozinski of the United States Court of Appeals for the Ninth Circuit and Associate Justice Anthony Kennedy of the Supreme Court of the United States. Keller then worked as an associate at Yetter Coleman LLP in Houston before joining the staff of Senator Ted Cruz, serving as chief counsel.

Keller was nominated to serve as solicitor general of Texas in 2015, succeeding Jonathan F. Mitchell. During his tenure, Keller argued 11 cases before the United States Supreme Court. Keller left the office in 2018 and was succeeded by Kyle D. Hawkins. Since leaving government service, Keller has worked as an attorney at Baker Botts, where he specializes in Supreme Court and constitutional law.

Personal life 

Keller married political commentator Sarah Isgur in a private ceremony at the Supreme Court. In July 2020, Isgur gave birth to their son, Nathanael Keller.

Keller is a member of the Federalist Society.

References

External links 
 Appearances at the U.S. Supreme Court from the Oyez Project

Year of birth missing (living people)
Living people
21st-century American lawyers
Federalist Society members
People associated with Baker Botts
Purdue University alumni
Solicitors General of Texas
University of Texas School of Law alumni